Ross House may refer to:

South Africa
John Ross House (Durban), a skyscraper

United States
John M. Ross House, a National Register of Historic Places listing in Phoenix, Arizona
Ross House (Echo Park, Los Angeles), a Los Angeles Historic-Cultural Monument in Silver Lake, Angelino Heights, and Echo Park
Ross House (San Jose, California)
Edgar and Rachel Ross House, Seaford, Delaware
Gov. William H. Ross House, Seaford, Delaware
John Ross House (Rossville, Georgia)
Joseph Ross House, Rochester, Illinois
Harvey Lee Ross House, Vermont, Illinois
David M. Ross House, a house in the Iron County MRA, Crystal Falls, Michigan
John Ross House (Branson, Missouri)
Ross House (Mexico, Missouri)
Nimrod Ross House, a National Register of Historic Places listings in Lancaster County, Nebraska
Dr. Robert M. Ross House, Artesia, New Mexico
Moses Ross House, Doe Run Valley, Pennsylvania
Dr. James A. Ross House, Pikeville, Tennessee

See also
John Ross House (disambiguation)
Ross-Averill House, a National Register of Historic Places listing in Linn County, Oregon
Ross Farm (disambiguation)
Ross-Gowdy House, a National Register of Historic Places listing in Clermont County, Ohio
Ross-Hand Mansion, South Nyack, New York
Ross-Sewell House, Jackson, Tennessee
Sibella Ross (1840–1929), New Zealand schoolteacher who ran a school called Ross House